The following is a list of countries by integrated circuit exports. Data is for 2019, in millions of United States dollars, as reported by International Trade Centre. Currently the top twenty countries are listed.

References 
Integrated circuit
Integrated circuits